The US DoD Modeling and Simulation Glossary (formally known as DoD 5000.59-M), was originally created in 1998.   the glossary was being updated, without changing its main objective of providing a uniform language for use by the M&S community. This article contains a list of terms and acronyms, based on the original DoD 5000.59-M and information related to the update.

History 
The original DoD Modeling and Simulation glossary: DoD 5000.59 was created in 1998, in hopes to promote a uniform set of terms across the Department of Defense.  The glossary consisted of three sections: sources, acronyms and terms. The first section was a set of sources from where the information for the glossary was accessed from. Second, a list of M&S related acronyms, and lastly a set of M&S terms with definitions.

Update 
Since 1998, the world of Modeling and Simulation has expanded.  With the rise of new technology including augmented reality, mixed reality, virtual worlds, SCORM (Sharable Content Object Reference Model), and agent based simulation, it has become apparent that as the industry of Modeling and Simulation continues to change and grow, so should its language.  Thus, a team of authors (University of Central Florida's (UCF) Institute for Simulation and Training (IST), contracted by the Joint Training Integration and Evaluation Center (JTIEC)) have set to revise and update the Modeling and Simulation Glossary to include new terminology, and to exclude out of date information.

Changes

The main objective of this effort was not to completely change the original 1998 M&S glossary, but rather to update and upgrade it.

The authors decided to err on the side of keeping the glossary inclusive of information rather than exclusive when it came to the addition of new terms and acronyms, while still maintaining a sense of readability. To that end the authors reached out to the research and academic communities for references and materials used in their M&S pursuits. The result was a comprehensive bibliography and description of terms at a general level, with the aim that for those interested, more detailed information could be found in the reference. At the current state of the glossary, it includes the addition of 35 references, 180 acronyms, and 500 definitions (includes multiple definitions). The glossary was to be fully completed by late 2010.

The glossary includes contribution from many US military organizations.



0–9

A

B

C

D

E

F

G

H

I

J

K

L

M

N

O

P

Q

R

S

T

U

V

W

X

Y

Z 



See also 
 Computer simulation
 Glossary of military abbreviations
 Military simulation
 Modeling and simulation
 Operations research

References

External links 
 Defense Acquisition University - Glossary of Defense Acquisition Acronyms & Terms 
 DoD Dictionary of Military and Associated Terms JP 1-02 
 Computer Aided Control System Design (CACSD) Multidisciplinary System Simulation Glossary 
 IEEE Std 610.3-1989 IEEE Standard Glossary of Modeling and Simulation Terminology 
 MilitaryTerms.info 
 NDIA Glossary 

Military Modeling
Military terminology of the United States
 Glossary
Wikipedia glossaries using tables